Tomasz Strejlau (born 1967) is a Polish football manager.

References

1967 births
Living people
Polish football managers
Hutnik Warsaw managers
Legia Warsaw non-playing staff
Polonia Warsaw managers